Regillio Tuur (born 8 August 1986) is a former Belgian footballer of Surinamese descent who played for SV Robinhood of the Surinamese Hoofdklasse between 2009 and 2011.

References 

1986 births
Living people
Belgian footballers
Belgian people of Surinamese descent
Belgian expatriate footballers
Expatriate footballers in Switzerland
Expatriate footballers in Suriname
S.V. Robinhood players
SVB Eerste Divisie players
Footballers from Flemish Brabant
Association football midfielders
Sportspeople from Leuven
Belgian expatriate sportspeople in Suriname
Belgian expatriate sportspeople in Switzerland